Splendrillia eburnea is a species of sea snail, a marine gastropod mollusk in the family Drilliidae.

Description
The length of the shell attains 10 mm, its diameter 4 mm.

(Original description) The solid, glossy, ivory-yellow shell has a cylindro-fusiform shape. The shell contains 7 whorls, including a two-whorled dome-shaped protoconch. The suture is impressed. There are no spirals. The ribs are set about fourteen to a whorl. They start up suddenly, immediately below the contracted fasciole area. They are prominent, perpendicular, wide-spaced, discontinuous, decreasing anteriorly, become obsolete on the body whorl, and vanish below the periphery. The aperture is wide. There is no varix. The outer lip is simple. The sinus is deep, U-shaped, right insertion incrassate. The throat is smooth. The inner lip is overlaid with a thick polished callus. The siphonal canal is short and open.

Distribution
This marine species is endemic to Australia and occurs off New South Wales and Victoria.

References

  Tucker, J.K. 2004 Catalog of recent and fossil turrids (Mollusca: Gastropoda). Zootaxa 682:1–1295.

eburnea
Gastropods of Australia
Gastropods described in 1922